Conassiminea studderti is a species of minute operculate snail, a marine gastropod mollusk or micromollusk in the family Assimineidae.

Description

Distribution
This supratidal marine species is endemic to Australia and occurs in mangroves off New South Wales and Tasmania

References

External links

Assimineidae
Gastropods described in 2006